Milton Al Stewart (born 1955) is an American attorney. He served as acting United States secretary of labor from January 20, 2021 to March 23, 2021. While serving in an acting position, Stewart remains the deputy assistant secretary of labor in charge of managing departmental day-to-day operations in the national office and six regional offices.

Education 
Stewart earned a Bachelor of Arts degree in history from Virginia State University, a Master of Arts in history and public administration from the University of North Carolina at Greensboro, and a Juris Doctor from North Carolina Central University.

Career 
Stewart's career in the Department of Labor began in 1991. He has served in numerous roles within the department, including director of the Business Operations Center, director of the Office of Administrative Services, director of Office of the Assistant Secretary for Administration and Management's Strategic and Performance Planning effort, and the director of the Office of Procurement and Grant Policy.

In March 2018, Stewart became the deputy assistant secretary of labor for operations.

As the Cabinet of the previous administration traditionally resigns at noon on inauguration day, Stewart was named acting secretary following the resignation of Eugene Scalia on January 20, 2021. He served in an acting capacity until Marty Walsh was confirmed by the United States Senate on March 22.

References 

1955 births
Biden administration cabinet members
Date of birth missing (living people)
Living people
North Carolina Central University alumni
People from Virginia
United States Army officers
United States Department of Labor officials
University of North Carolina at Greensboro alumni
Virginia State University alumni